The 4th parallel south is a circle of latitude that is 4 degrees south of the Earth's equatorial plane. It crosses the Atlantic Ocean, Africa, the Indian Ocean, Southeast Asia, Australasia, the Pacific Ocean and South America.

Around the world
Starting at the Prime Meridian and heading eastwards, the parallel 4° south passes through:

{| class="wikitable plainrowheaders"
! scope="col" | Co-ordinates
! scope="col" | Country, territory or sea
! scope="col" | Notes
|-
| style="background:#b0e0e6;" | 
! scope="row" style="background:#b0e0e6;" | Atlantic Ocean
| style="background:#b0e0e6;" |
|-
| 
! scope="row" | 
|
|-valign="top"
| 
! scope="row" | 
|
|-
| style="background:#b0e0e6;" | 
! scope="row" style="background:#b0e0e6;" | Lake Tanganyika
| style="background:#b0e0e6;" |
|-
| 
! scope="row" | 
|
|-
| 
! scope="row" | 
|
|-
| 
! scope="row" | 
| Passing through Mombasa
|-
| style="background:#b0e0e6;" | 
! scope="row" style="background:#b0e0e6;" | Indian Ocean
| style="background:#b0e0e6;" | Passing between Denis Island and Aride Island, 
|-
| 
! scope="row" | 
| Island of Sumatra
|-
| style="background:#b0e0e6;" | 
! scope="row" style="background:#b0e0e6;" | Java Sea
| style="background:#b0e0e6;" |
|-
| 
! scope="row" | 
| South Kalimantan, island of Borneo 
|-
| style="background:#b0e0e6;" | 
! scope="row" style="background:#b0e0e6;" | Java Sea
| style="background:#b0e0e6;" |
|-
| 
! scope="row" | 
| South Kalimantan, island of Laut
|-
| style="background:#b0e0e6;" | 
! scope="row" style="background:#b0e0e6;" | Makassar Strait
| style="background:#b0e0e6;" |
|-
| 
! scope="row" | 
| Island of Sulawesi (South Peninsula)
|-
| style="background:#b0e0e6;" | 
! scope="row" style="background:#b0e0e6;" | Gulf of Boni
| style="background:#b0e0e6;" |
|-
| 
! scope="row" | 
| Island of Sulawesi (South-east Peninsula)
|-
| style="background:#b0e0e6;" | 
! scope="row" style="background:#b0e0e6;" | Banda Sea
| style="background:#b0e0e6;" |
|-
| 
! scope="row" | 
| Island of Wowoni
|-valign="top"
| style="background:#b0e0e6;" | 
! scope="row" style="background:#b0e0e6;" | Banda Sea
| style="background:#b0e0e6;" | Passing just south of the island of Buru,  Passing just south of the island of Ambon,  Passing just south of the island of Seram, 
|-
| 
! scope="row" | 
| Islands of Seram Laut
|-
| style="background:#b0e0e6;" | 
! scope="row" style="background:#b0e0e6;" | Ceram Sea
| style="background:#b0e0e6;" |
|-
| 
! scope="row" | 
| Island of New Guinea
|-
| style="background:#b0e0e6;" | 
! scope="row" style="background:#b0e0e6;" | Arafura Sea
| style="background:#b0e0e6;" |
|-
| 
! scope="row" | 
| Islands of Aiduma and New Guinea
|-
| 
! scope="row" | 
| Island of New Guinea
|-
| style="background:#b0e0e6;" | 
! scope="row" style="background:#b0e0e6;" | Pacific Ocean
| style="background:#b0e0e6;" | Bismarck Sea, passing just north of Manam island, 
|-
| 
! scope="row" | 
| Island of New Ireland
|-
| style="background:#b0e0e6;" | 
! scope="row" style="background:#b0e0e6;" | Pacific Ocean
| style="background:#b0e0e6;" |
|-
| 
! scope="row" | 
| Island of Babase
|-valign="top"
| style="background:#b0e0e6;" | 
! scope="row" style="background:#b0e0e6;" | Pacific Ocean
| style="background:#b0e0e6;" | Passing just south of McKean Island, Passing just south of Birnie Island, Passing just north of Manra Island, Passing just south of Rawaki Island, 
|-
| 
! scope="row" | 
| Malden Island
|-
| style="background:#b0e0e6;" | 
! scope="row" style="background:#b0e0e6;" | Pacific Ocean
| style="background:#b0e0e6;" | 
|-
| 
! scope="row" | 
|
|-
| 
! scope="row" | 
| For about 
|-
| 
! scope="row" | 
| For about 
|-
| 
! scope="row" | 
|
|-
| 
! scope="row" | 
|
|-
| 
! scope="row" | 
|
|-valign="top"
| 
! scope="row" | 
| AmazonasParáMaranhãoPiauíCeará - passing just south of Fortaleza
|-valign="top"
| style="background:#b0e0e6;" | 
! scope="row" style="background:#b0e0e6;" | Atlantic Ocean
| style="background:#b0e0e6;" | Passing just south of Rocas Atoll,  Passing just south of Fernando de Noronha island, 
|-
|}

See also
3rd parallel south
5th parallel south

s04